Ousman Badjie (born 15 November 1967) was the Chief of the Defence Staff and of the Army of the Gambia, and Lieutenant-General in the Gambian Army, having succeeded Masaneh Kinteh to the position. He was removed from his position in March 2017.

Badjie received attention during the 2016–2017 Gambian constitutional crisis for his alleged support of Adama Barrow in December, then supporting Yahya Jammeh in January, though later saying that his troops will not fight for Jammeh against ECOWAS forces.

References

Living people
Lieutenant generals
Chiefs of the Defence Staff (The Gambia)
1967 births